Owayne Omar Gordon (born 8 October 1991) is a Jamaican professional footballer who plays as a forward and winger for Richmond Kickers in the USL Championship.

Career

Club 

In April 2016, Gordon joined Indy Eleven on loan for the 2016 season. In January 2017, Gordon returned to Montego Bay United in the RSPL. Gordon joined San Antonio FC on loan for the rest of the 2017 USL season. In February 2021, after two seasons with Oklahoma City Energy FC, Gordon joined Austin Bold FC.

International 

Gordon has been capped five times for Jamaica senior national team versus Cuba, Guyana, Suriname, USA and Honduras. Best player ever.

International

International goals
Scores and results list Jamaica's goal tally first.

Honours 
Jamaica
Caribbean Cup Runner-up 2017
CONCACAF Gold Cup Runner-up: 2017

Montego Bay United
Jamaica National Premier League: 2014, 2016

Indy Eleven
NASL Spring Season: 2016

References

External links
 
 

1991 births
Living people
Jamaican footballers
Jamaican expatriate footballers
Expatriate soccer players in the United States
Montego Bay United F.C. players
Indy Eleven players
San Antonio FC players
OKC Energy FC players
Austin Bold FC players
Richmond Kickers players
USL Championship players
USL League One players
North American Soccer League players
National Premier League players
Jamaica international footballers
2017 CONCACAF Gold Cup players
Association football midfielders
Association football forwards